Scott William Garrelts (born October 30, 1961) is a former Major League Baseball pitcher who played for the San Francisco Giants from 1982 to 1991. Garrelts's best year as a Giant came during the 1989 season, when he went 14-5 with a 2.28 ERA, leading his team to the World Series against their Bay Area rivals, the Oakland Athletics.

High school and minors
Garrelts attended high school at Buckley Loda High School in Buckley, Illinois.

Major League career
Garrelts was the Giants' lone All-Star in 1985, a season in which he led the team in wins and ERA, and had streak of 24 consecutive scoreless innings, all as a reliever. In 1986, he was second on the Giants in wins and strikeouts. Garrelts missed the final month of the 1987 season with a broken finger tip, but still finished second on the Giants in saves, a stat in which he led the team in 1988. He missed a month of the 1989 season with a pulled hamstring. During the season, Garrelts switched from the bullpen to a starting role and led the N.L. in ERA. He was second on the Giants in wins and strikeouts in 1990.

On July 29, 1990, Garrelts took a no-hitter into the ninth inning at home against the Cincinnati Reds, which was broken up by Paul O'Neill, with a two-out single over shortstop Jose Uribe's head.

While with the Giants, Garrelts and teammates Dave Dravecky, Atlee Hammaker, and Jeff Brantley became known as the "God Squad" because of their strong Christian faith. Foregoing the hard-partying lifestyle of many of their teammates, they preferred to hold Bible studies in their hotel rooms while on the road.

See also
List of Major League Baseball annual ERA leaders
List of Major League Baseball players who spent their entire career with one franchise

References

External links

Giants of 1989 Bask in the Memories

National League All-Stars
National League ERA champions
San Francisco Giants players
Major League Baseball pitchers
Baseball players from Illinois
People from Urbana, Illinois
1961 births
Living people
Great Falls Giants players
Clinton Giants players
Shreveport Captains players
Phoenix Giants players
San Jose Giants players
Phoenix Firebirds players
Rancho Cucamonga Quakes players
Las Vegas Stars (baseball) players
Omaha Royals players
People from Buckley, Illinois